Warren Neal “Trey” Moore III (born October 2, 1972), is a former American professional baseball pitcher. He also played three seasons in the Nippon Professional Baseball (NPB), from  until , for the Hanshin Tigers and Orix BlueWave.

A native of Houston, Texas, Moore attended Keller High School and Texas A&M University. In 1993, he played collegiate summer baseball with the Chatham A's of the Cape Cod Baseball League. He was selected by the Seattle Mariners in the second round of the 1994 MLB Draft.

References

Sources
, or Retrosheet, or Pura Pelota (Venezuelan Winter League)

1972 births
Living people
American expatriate baseball players in Canada
American expatriate baseball players in Japan
Atlanta Braves players
Baseball players from Houston
Bellingham Mariners players
Chatham Anglers players
Hanshin Tigers players
Harrisburg Senators players
Lancaster JetHawks players
Major League Baseball pitchers
Montreal Expos players
Nippon Professional Baseball pitchers
Orix BlueWave players
Ottawa Lynx players
Port City Roosters players
Richmond Braves players
Riverside Pilots players
Texas A&M Aggies baseball players
Texas A&M University alumni
Tiburones de La Guaira players
American expatriate baseball players in Venezuela